Stein's cuscus (Phalanger vestitus) is a species of marsupial in the family Phalangeridae. It is found in Indonesia and Papua New Guinea.

References

Possums
Mammals described in 1877
Taxonomy articles created by Polbot
Marsupials of New Guinea